The team dressage in equestrian at the 1976 Olympic Games in Montreal was held at Olympic Equestrian Centre on 29 July.

Competition format

The team medals were awarded after the Grand-Prix portion of the individual competition.  After the Grand-Prix portion of the individual event the three rides of each team were added up and the highest score was the winner, all three scores counted towards the final.  Both the team and the individual competitions ran concurrently.

Results

References

Equestrian at the 1976 Summer Olympics